Megalodoras is a small genus of thorny catfishes native to tropical South America.

Species 
There are currently two recognized species in this genus:
 Megalodoras guayoensis (Fernández-Yépez, 1968)
 Megalodoras uranoscopus (C. H. Eigenmann & R. S. Eigenmann, 1888)

References

Doradidae
Fish of South America
Catfish genera
Taxa named by Carl H. Eigenmann
Freshwater fish genera